The Canberra Labor Club Strikers are a nationally competing women's field hockey team based in Australian Capital Territory. Coached by Mark Stafford, they compete in the Australian Hockey League. They are captained by Shelley Watson and Meredith Bone. They have not won the AHL title to date, but have been runners-up on 4 occasions.

References

Women's field hockey teams in Australia